Bruce McGaw is a Bay Area Figurative Movement artist and professor emeritus of the San Francisco Art Institute. He was born in Berkeley, California in 1935 and studied at the California College of the Arts with Richard Diebenkorn and others in the 1950's.

Biography and education 
In 1955 at age 18 McGaw came to Oakland’s California College of Arts and Crafts (now the California College of the Arts) and was in the institution’s first class taught by Richard Diebenkorn after Diebenkorn's return to California from the East Coast. McGaw’s paintings during the mid-1950s reflect an interest in later Abstract Expressionist styles, with lush colors and loose, spirited forms. By 1957, McGaw had moved more deeply into representational work and the handling of the human figure that would come drive his work for the next half-century. This energetic observational direction drew from the energy of the other Bay Area figurative artists active at the time including David Park (painter) and Elmer Bischoff.

Studio and teaching practice 
In describing his relationship to teaching and his own painting practice McGaw states, "Painting is one of the oldest of human activities and remains vital and essential. Its wonder is related to the challenges and difficulties of its physical limitations, its constrained format and fixed facture, always totally present, a poetry of sight. Painting taps the deepest and most considered resources of its maker."

McGaw's work consists largely of medium to large-scale oil paintings and charcoal drawings featuring human figures in moments of quite repose, still lives of vignettes found often in his studio and landscapes capturing the powerful light of the San Francisco Bay Area cast on the mixed industrial and working-class suburbs of East Bay towns like Emeryville, California. An avid student of art history and poetry he cites significant texts and relationships with colleagues among the most important influences in his studio practice.

McGaw continues to paint and draw in the studio he built in 1990 in the Oakland Hills.

Selected exhibitions 

 Bruce McGaw Paintings, Fresno Museum of Art, Fresno, CA, 2009
 Bruce McGaw Paintings, Walter and McBean Galleries, San Francisco Art Institute, 2008
 Bruce McGaw Early Paintings, John Bergruen Gallery, San Francisco, CA, 2000
 Bruce McGaw: A Survey of Fifty Years, John Natsoulas Gallery, Davis, CA, 2004

Selected publications 

 Rapko, John. “Artists Of Invention At the Oakland Museum.” Art Week Vol. 39 # 1, Feb. 2008.
 Cripps, Michael. “Bruce McGaw; An Artistic Force In The San Francisco Bay Area.” Lifescapes, May 2006.
 Dalkey, Victoria. “Bright Path In Shadows.” Sacramento Bee, Dec. 19, 2004.
 Bolden, Vanessa. Bruce McGaw; A Survey of 50 Years. John Natsoulas Gallery, Davis, CA, December 2004.
 Jones, Caroline. Bay Area Figurative Art 1950-1965. San Francisco Museum of Art, San Francisco, CA, 1989.

Education 

 BFA, California College Of Arts & Crafts, 1957

References

Living people
Artists from Berkeley, California
California College of the Arts alumni
San Francisco Art Institute faculty
Year of birth missing (living people)